Kessell is a surname. Notable people with the surname include:

 Mary Kessell (1914–1977), British artist
 Rick Kessell (born 1949), Canadian ice hockey player
 Simone Kessell (born 1975), New Zealand actress

Fictional characters:
Akar Kessell, character in The Icewind Dale novels by R.A. Salvatore

Nicole Kessell, senior of change management at new Corp

See also
 Kessel (surname)